Lee Thompson (born 25 March 1982 in Sheffield, England) is a professional association football midfielder who made almost 100 appearances in Football League Two for Boston United between 2002 and 2005.

Career
Thompson, who is a former England youth international, began his career as a trainee at Sheffield United in 2001 but did not make an appearance for the club, and joined Boston United on loan in October 2002, where he made six appearances, scoring five goals, including a hat-trick in a 3–2 win at Darlington He joined Boston on a permanent basis in November 2002 and made almost 100 appearances for Boston in Football League Two before he was released by the club in May 2005 after not being able to agree a new contract.

Thompson joined Conference National club Kidderminster Harriers in July 2005 and, after a slow start to the season, established himself in the first-team, making 34 appearances for Kidderminster in the 2005–06 season. However, he was one of seven players released at the end of a disappointing season for Kidderminster, and he joined Worksop Town, signing a one-year contract. He made 41 appearances for Worksop Town in the 2006–07 season. In July 2007, Thompson rejoined Boston United, now in the Conference North, with manager Tommy Taylor saying, "Lee is someone I've known for a while and I'll go a long way to find a better player than him." He made 16 appearances for Boston in the 2007–08 season. Lee now plays his football at Worksop Parramore.

Personal life
Thompson is the father of the footballer Declan Thompson.

References

External links

Lee Thompson 2006–07 stats, SoccerfactsUK.

1982 births
Living people
Footballers from Sheffield
English footballers
Association football midfielders
Kidderminster Harriers F.C. players
Boston United F.C. players
Worksop Town F.C. players
Sheffield United F.C. players